Grafskoye is a rural locality (a village) in Kelteyevsky Selsoviet, Kaltasinsky District, Bashkortostan, Russia. The population was 64 as of 2010. There is 1 street.

Geography 
Grafskoye is located 28 km southwest of Kaltasy (the district's administrative centre) by road. Nizhnyaya Tatya is the nearest rural locality.

References 

Rural localities in Kaltasinsky District